The Integral is a diesel multiple unit (DMU) train type operated by Regiobahn GmbH on commuter services in North Rhine-Westphalia. Between 1998 and 2020, they were operated by the Bayerische Oberlandbahn on regional services between Munich, Bayrischzell, Lenggries and Tegernsee. They were built by the now defunct Jenbacher Werke.

Formation

Each Integral unit consists of five sections, formed as shown in table below. The two "FGZ" sections are suspended between the end- and intermediate cars.

Technical specifications
The trains are powered by diesel-hydraulic motors. One end car has all wheelsets powered, the other end car has only one powered wheelset. All six wheelsets use active radial steering. The trains are able to run in multiple unit formation.

History
The trains entered service in November 1998. Following problems and malfunctions, the fleet was returned to its manufacturer in Jenbach, and was overhauled, which increased their reliability.

One unit was used at the Test- and Validationcenter Wegberg-Wildenrath for testing of an anti-collision system by the Deutsches Zentrum für Luft- und Raumfahrt (DLR).

The Integral trains were withdrawn by Bayerische Oberlandbahn after their last day of service on July 25, 2020, being replaced by LINT 54 units.

After their withdrawal from service in Bavaria, Integral trains were transferred to the Regiobahn GmbH in North Rhine-Westphalia, where they entered service on VRR S-Bahn line S28 in December 2020.

References

External links

The Integral - Bayerische Oberlandbahn official website (archived on March 31, 2012) 

Diesel multiple units of Germany
Articulated passenger trains